The 2016 United States presidential election in Wisconsin was held on November 8, 2016, as part of the 2016 United States presidential election. Wisconsin voters chose 10 electors to represent them in the Electoral College via a popular vote pitting Republican Party nominee Donald Trump against Democratic Party nominee Hillary Clinton.

On April 5, 2016, in the presidential primaries, Wisconsin voters expressed their preferences for the Democratic and Republican Parties' respective nominees for president in an open primary; voters were allowed to vote in either party's primary regardless of their own party affiliation. Bernie Sanders prevailed in Wisconsin's Democratic primary, while Ted Cruz won Wisconsin's Republican primary.

In the general election, Donald Trump unexpectedly won Wisconsin by a narrow margin of 0.77%, with 47.22% of the total votes over the 46.45% of Hillary Clinton. Wisconsin was the tipping-point state of the 2016 election; that is, the closest state that both candidates needed to win in order to emerge with a victory in the election (for example, Michigan, while closer, was not necessary for a Trump victory).

Trump's victory in Wisconsin was attributed to underestimated support from white working-class voters, a demographic group that had previously tended to vote for the Democratic candidate. 

By winning Wisconsin, Trump became the first Republican candidate to win the state since Ronald Reagan in 1984. He also became the first Republican to win a majority in Iron County since 1920. Wisconsin weighed in for this election as 2.9% more Republican than the nation-at-large, the first time it voted to the right of the nation since 2000. Wisconsin was also one of eleven states to have voted twice for Bill Clinton, which Hillary Clinton lost. This is the only election since 1960 in which the Democratic nominee won the popular vote without Wisconsin.

Primaries

The incumbent President of the United States, Barack Obama, a Democrat, was first elected president in the 2008 election, running with then Senator Joe Biden of Delaware. Defeating the Republican nominee, Senator John McCain of Arizona, with 52.9% of the popular vote and 68% of the electoral vote, Obama succeeded two-term Republican President George W. Bush. Obama and Biden were reelected in the 2012 presidential election, defeating former Massachusetts Governor Mitt Romney with 51.1% of the popular vote and 61.7% of electoral votes. Although Barack Obama's approval rating in the RealClearPolitics poll tracking average remained between 40 and 50 percent for most of his second term, it has experienced a surge in early 2016 and reached its highest point since 2012 during June of that year. Analyst Nate Cohn has noted that a strong approval rating for President Obama would equate to a strong performance for the Democratic candidate, and vice versa.

Following his second term, President Obama was not eligible for another reelection. In October 2015, Obama's running-mate and two-term Vice President Biden decided not to enter the race for the Democratic presidential nomination either. With Obama and Biden's terms expiring on January 20, 2017, the electorate was asked to elect a new president, the 45th president and 48th vice president of the United States, respectively.

Democratic Primary

Democratic presidential debate in Milwaukee, February 2016

The Democratic Party held its sixth presidential debate on February 11, 2016, in Milwaukee, Wisconsin, at the University of Wisconsin–Milwaukee. The debate was hosted by PBS NewsHour anchors Gwen Ifill and Judy Woodruff; it aired on PBS and was simulcast by CNN. Participants were Hillary Clinton and Bernie Sanders.

Democratic primary, April 2016

Republican Primary

Presidential debate in Milwaukee, November 2015

The Republican Party held its fourth presidential debate on November 10, 2015, in Milwaukee, at the Milwaukee Theatre. Moderated by Neil Cavuto, Maria Bartiromo  and Gerard Baker, the debate aired on the Fox Business Network and was sponsored by The Wall Street Journal. Eight candidates including Donald Trump, Ben Carson, Marco Rubio, Ted Cruz, Jeb Bush, Carly Fiorina, John Kasich, and Rand Paul, participated in the primetime debate that was mostly focused on jobs, taxes, and the general health of the U.S. economy, as well as on domestic and international policy issues. The accompanying undercard debate featured Chris Christie, Mike Huckabee, Rick Santorum, and Bobby Jindal who ended his campaign a week after the debate.

Republican primary, April 2016

Green Party presidential preference convention
The Wisconsin Green Party held its presidential preference vote at its annual state convention in Madison, Wisconsin, on April 16.

General Election

Voting history
Wisconsin joined the Union in May 1848 and has participated in all elections from 1848 onwards. Since 1900, Wisconsin has been won by the Democrats and Republicans the same number of times. Republican-turned-Progressive Robert M. La Follette Sr. carried the state in the 1924 presidential election.

The state voted for the Democratic nominee in the seven elections from 1988 to 2012, although sometimes by small margins, as it was in 1992, 2000, and 2004. There were other occasions, in contrast, when the margin of victory was substantial, such as 1996, 2008, and 2012.

Predictions

Polling

Polls consistently showed Democratic nominee Hillary Clinton leading by a margin of two to eight points in a four-way race. The last poll published prior to the election was by SurveyMonkey and had Hillary Clinton with a two-point lead over Donald Trump. Clinton never visited the state during the general election campaign, while Trump visited six times. On election day, Trump ended up carrying the state by less than a point, a difference of an average of five to six points from most pre-election polling. Prior to the election, many major news networks and professional and election analysts predicted the state as either lean or likely Democratic. Wisconsin's unexpected swing to Trump, along with two other Rust Belt states (Pennsylvania, Michigan), was the deciding factor in his win of 306–232 over Clinton, despite her garnering a plurality of the votes. Clinton referenced the loss in her memoir What Happened: "If there's one place where we were caught by surprise, it was Wisconsin. Polls showed us comfortably ahead, right up until the end. They also looked good for the Democrat running for Senate, Russ Feingold." Interestingly, Trump did not win Wisconsin unlike the other states that he flipped by finding new voters, rather retaining more of Romney's vote, as the total votes cast in Wisconsin declined from 2012.

Results

By congressional districts

Donald Trump won 6 of the 8 congressional districts, including one held by a Democrat.

Results by county
Official results by county following recount.

Counties that flipped from Democratic to Republican
Adams (largest city: Adams)
Buffalo (largest city: Mondovi)
Columbia (largest city: Portage)
Crawford (largest city: Prairie du Chien)
Door (largest city: Sturgeon Bay)
Dunn (largest city: Menomonie)
Forest (largest city: Crandon)
Grant (largest city: Platteville)
Jackson (largest city: Black River Falls)
Juneau (largest city: Mauston)
Kenosha (largest city: Kenosha)
Lafayette (largest city: Darlington)
Lincoln (largest city: Merrill)
Marquette (largest city: Montello)
Pepin (largest city: Durand)
Price (largest city: Park Falls)
Racine (largest city: Racine)
Richland (largest city: Richland Center)
Sauk (largest city: Baraboo)
Sawyer (largest city: Hayward)
Trempealeau (largest city: Arcadia)
Vernon (largest city: Viroqua)
Winnebago (largest city: Oshkosh)

Recount
On November 25, 2016, with 90 minutes remaining on the deadline to petition for a recount to the state's electoral body, Jill Stein, 2016 presidential candidate of the Green Party of the United States, filed for a recount of the election results in Wisconsin. She signaled she intended to file for similar recounts in the subsequent days in the states of Michigan and Pennsylvania. On November 26, the Clinton campaign announced that they were joining the  recount effort in Wisconsin.

The final result of the recount confirmed Trump's victory in Wisconsin, where he gained a net 131 votes. Trump gained 837 additional votes, while Clinton gained 706 additional votes. During the recount Trump had filed a lawsuit to halt the process, but a federal judge had rejected the lawsuit.

See also
 United States presidential elections in Wisconsin
 2016 Democratic Party presidential debates and forums
 2016 Democratic Party presidential primaries
 2016 Republican Party presidential debates and forums
 2016 Republican Party presidential primaries
 2016 United States presidential election recounts

Notes

References

Further reading

External links
 RNC 2016 Republican Nominating Process 
 Green papers for 2016 primaries, caucuses, and conventions
 FoxNews full election coverage, Wisconsin

WI
2016
Presidential